OpenCola, Opencola, or open cola may refer to:
 Open-source cola, cola with an openly available recipe.
 Opencola, the free-software P2P company started by Grad Conn, Cory Doctorow, and John Henson.
 OpenCola (drink), a brand of open-source cola produced by the free-software company Opencola.